Mashhad-e Miqan (also Romanized as Mashhad-e Mīqān and Mashhad-e Meyqān; also known as Mashhad-e Mīghān, Mash’had-e-Mīyqān, and Meshed) is a village in Mashhad-e Miqan Rural District, in the Central District of Arak County, Markazi Province, Iran. At the 2006 census, its population was 338, in 97 families.

References 

Populated places in Arak County